Dārziņš (Old orthography: Dahrsin; feminine: Dārziņa) is a Latvian topographic surname, derived from the Latvian word for "garden" (dārzs). Individuals with the surname include:

Emīls Dārziņš (1875–1910), Latvian composer, conductor and music critic
Lauris Dārziņš (born 1985), Latvian ice hockey player
Volfgangs Dārziņš (1906–1962), Latvian composer

Latvian toponymic surnames
Latvian-language masculine surnames